On Sunday night, October 16, 1859, the abolitionist John Brown led a motley band of 22 in a raid on the federal arsenal at Harpers Ferry, Virginia (since 1863, West Virginia). Most were much younger than him, and varied dramatically in social class and education. "It would be hard to find again such a strange party as that which upheld John Brown in his daring expedition."

All but 5, who successfully escaped north, were either killed during the raid, or captured, tried, and executed.

Brown's raid on Harpers Ferry
Brown's intentions have been much discussed. He was to seize the arms in the Harpers Ferry Armory, as many as could be taken, and use them to arm the white supporters and those few enslaved who could handle a firearm; for the others he ordered pikes. In the Appalachian Mountains there would be an anti-slavery polity, encouraging the enslaved to flee their owners, as far south as Georgia, and then escape to Canada. Brown expected that a large number of the enslaved would join the revolt, but only a few did.

In the short term, the raid was a total failure. Brown and his men quickly captured the armory, which had only one watchman, and took over 60 residents of Harpers Ferry hostage as they arrived for work. Militia summoned from neighboring towns took over both bridges, thus cutting off escape, and by noon Monday forced Brown and his party to take refuge in the fire engine house of the armory, a sturdy building later known as John Brown's Fort. The militia freed most of the hostages, leaving only the handful in the engine house. Brown's party held out until Tuesday morning, when a company of Marines, led by Col. Robert E. Lee, quickly broke down the doors to the engine house and took the surviving raiders captive. The seven survivors, including John Brown himself, were quickly tried for treason, murder, and inciting a slave revolt, and were convicted and executed by hanging, in the Jefferson County seat of Charles Town. John Brown was the first person executed for treason in the history of the United States.

However, the raid and the following trials were extensively covered by the press. "The country had not been so excited about anything in twenty years." Historians frequently credit the raid not for starting the Civil War, but for providing the spark that lit the waiting bomb, or as Brown would have put it, causing "the volcano beneath the snow" to erupt. Brown thought that without violence, slavery in the United States would never end. As Frederick Douglass put it in a famous speech, given in Harpers Ferry, at  Storer College, in 1881, "If John Brown did not end the war that ended slavery, he...began the war that ended American slavery and made this a free Republic."

The people of Virginia were furious, outraged at this attempt to get their allegedly happy enslaved to revolt. They took out their anger at any opportunity. Watson Brown was shot when he left the engine house carrying a white flag. William Thompson was shot on the bridge and taken to the hotel parlor; armed men came in, dragged him out, and threw him over the bridge into the river, firing as he fell. The owner of the hotel did not want the carpet ruined by shooting him there.

The bodies of the slain lay in the streets, on the river banks, or wherever they fell. The body of the first man killed, Dangerfield Newby, lay in the street from 11 AM Monday, when he was killed, until Tuesday afternoon, and was partially eaten by hogs; his ears and other body parts were cut off as souvenirs. The bodies of two of the men killed were taken by medical students to Winchester Medical College, for dissection. The remainder, which no local cemetery would accept, were dragged into a "gruesome pile", boxed, and dumped in an unmarked pit on the far side of the Shenandoah.

As of 2012 there had never been a book on any of Brown's raiders. Three appeared in quick succession: 2012 on John Cook, 2015 on John Copeland, and in 2020 on Shields Green, plus a 2018 book on Brown's five Black raiders.

Sources of information

Osborne Anderson published a memoir, the only participant to do so, but it attracted little attention. The only raiders whose stories are relatively well known are those processed through the Virginia legal system and publicly executed, although no centralized record was kept of what happened to their corpses. Three of them have been the subject of recent (2015–2020) books: John Edwin Cook, whose testimony was quickly published in a pamphlet to raise money for one of the victims, John Anthony Copeland, and Shields Green.

As for the others, they had come from all over the country and Canada, and were from diverse social classes, from fugitive slaves to the upper middle class. Given the chaos which succeeded the raid, with many dead or dying, some unidentified corpses taken to a nearby medical college for instructional use, some raiders fleeing and being captured and others fleeing successfully, and unidentified bodies floating down the Potomac River, there is much confusion in the details about who was involved and what happened to them. More information is available about the white participants than the black people, who were treated far more roughly from beginning to end.

As a result different sources can have differing pieces of information, or sometimes misinformation, about who was involved. As explained below, some bodies were not identified until many years afterward. The bronze plaque above the graves at the John Brown Farm itself contains errors. (It reports that the remains of Jerry Anderson are buried there, which is not correct, and it lists among negroes who escaped a non-existent John Anderson.)

Previous reviews of Brown's men 
It was some time later, after the War had ended and books on Brown had been published, that discussions of John Brown's men as a group started to appear. The first attempt is a brief, anonymous, and inaccurate article of 1869.
 In 1874, Owen Brown comments on raiders Charles Plummer Tidd, John E. Cook, Barclay Coppoc, and Francis Jackson Merriam.
  Reprinted in the Ohio State Archaeological and Historical Quarterly, 1949.
 Richard J. Hinton, who became a newspaper reporter and editor, and later a geologist, was an "intimate friend" of John Brown in Kansas. On occasion of the recovery of the body of Watson Brown in 1882, he published in his paper "a chapter as to what became of the others who were with Brown at Harper's Ferry". A longer version soon appeared.  In 1889 this became a magazine article, and then 130 pages in his John Brown and His Men (1894). Many of the sketched portraits in the gallery below are from this book. In 1899, after the donation of the John Brown Farm to the state of New York, he summarized his conclusions.
 The New York World, in 1889. Despite the title of the article ("John Brown's Descendants. How the Family of the Famous Harper's Ferry Hero Are Scattered"), it reviews everyone who was with Brown at Harpers Ferry.
 Thomas Featherstonhaugh, "John Brown's men" (1899).
 
 A person whose initials were ASR compiled in 1995 "The Conspirators['] Biographies".
 Tony Horwitz, "The Toll from the Raid on Harpers Ferry", in Midnight rising : John Brown and the raid that sparked the Civil War (2011).
 National Park Service, "John Brown's Raiders at Harpers Ferry" (2017).

Ages
The oldest was Dangerfield Newby, at 44. Owen Brown was 35. All the rest were under 30. Oliver Brown, Barclay Coppoc, and William H. Leeman were under 21. John Brown was 59. The ages of the black people, such as Shields Green, vary considerably from one source to another, between 22 and 30.

Counts
Of Brown's party of 22, counting himself,
 19 went to Harpers Ferry (Jerry Anderson, Osborne Anderson, John Brown, his sons Oliver and Watson Brown, Cook, Copeland, Edwin Coppock, Green, Hazlett, Kagi, Leary, Leeman, Newby, Stevens, Taylor, brothers Adolphus and William Thompson, Tidd)
 3 (Owen Brown, Barclay Coppock, Meriam) remained at the Kennedy Farm in Maryland, "to guard the arms and ammunition stored on the premises, until it should be time to move them." All successfully escaped once they learned the raid was failing.
—————
Of the 22,
10 were killed during the raid or died shortly after of their wounds (Jerry Anderson, Oliver Brown, Watson Brown, Kagi, Leary, Leeman, Newby, Taylor, Adolphus Thompson, William Thompson)
7 were tried and executed, 5 who were taken prisoner on the spot (John Brown, Cook, Copeland, Edwin Coppock,  Green) plus 2 who escaped but were captured (Hazlitt, Stevens)
5 escaped north and were not captured (Osborne Anderson, Owen Brown, Barclay Coppock, Meriam, Tidd).
————
Brown's children:
 Three of Brown's sons participated in the raid. Two, Oliver and Watson, were shot on Monday at the engine house; Oliver died after a few hours in agony, but Watson not until early Wednesday morning. Owen Brown escaped and became an officer in the Union Army. Watson's body was recovered in 1882; Oliver's not until 1899. Salmon Brown, though he had been with his father and brothers in Kansas, did not want to participate in the Harpers Ferry raid and remained in North Elba, running the farm. John Jr. and Jason also declined to participate.

 Brown's daughter Annie Brown, who at the time was 15, and Oliver's wife Martha, 17, were at the Kennedy farm, doing the cooking and housekeeping while they "kept discreet watch over the prattling conspirators in the house and hustled them out of sight on occasion, and who turned aside local suspicion by their sweet and honest ways," John sent them home to North Elba on September 29 or 30. Martha was visibly pregnant; she died in February after giving birth prematurely.

Much later Annie shared with an interviewer some of her recollections. "Ever after, Annie saw her months at the Kennedy farm as the most important of her life."

Black participation
The most important question regarding the meaning of Brown's raid is the participation by black people, who were of course to be the primary beneficiaries of Brown's anti-slavery efforts. (Brown and many others thought that whites would also benefit from the end of slavery, as was argued at length in 1857 in The Impending Crisis of the South.)

Black people among Brown's raiders
Of the members of Brown's party, 17 were white and 5 (23%) were Black. Of the five black people, two (Leary, Newby) died during the raid, two (Copeland and Green) were tried and executed, and one (Osborne Anderson) escaped. Two (Green and Newby) had been enslaved, with Newby having been granted his freedom and Green a fugitive; three (Osborne Anderson, Copeland, and Leary) were free black people, but Copeland was a fugitive from the charge of participating in the 1858 Oberlin-Wellington Rescue, of which he was a leader.

Black people who joined Brown's rebellion
Brown said many times that he had expected a large number of enslaved black people of Jefferson County to flee their owners and assist him in the raid and afterwards. This did not happen, a main reason for the raid's failure. However, this was extended, especially by Virginia Governor Wise, to a claim that black people were hostile to Brown and gave him no support at all. Both black and white people denied black participation. Any black person who could claim they were there involuntarily did so, and most did, as otherwise they would have been executed. (Shields Green was not successful at this, since his skin was so dark that Harpers Ferry residents immediately recognized he was not a local.) The whites went along with this. It was a basic belief in the South at the time that their slaves were happy, and they would be happier if abolitionists just left them alone; they were highly motivated to believe that no slaves supported Brown.

Another raider who escaped, C. P. Tidd, said much the same. Captain Dangerfield reported seeing "negroes armed with pikes" when he arrived at the Armory. According to a local newspaper, "the slaves for miles around Harper's Ferry, though well kept and kindly treated, were well informed as to John Brown's movement, and prepared to take part in the insurrection." Brown's mistake was that, afraid of betrayal by Cook or Forbes, he "suddenly changed the time to two weeks earlier". He failed to notify the slaves of the change.

A correspondent from the Cincinnati Commercial, in Charles Town for the execution, reported: "As to the negroes round about Harper's Ferry and Charlestown there can be no doubt but they were deeply interested in the events that have recently taken place, and that many of them looked upon the outbreak, as the lifting of the dark cloud of slavery from their race. ...It is believed that many of the negroes did know something extraordinary was about to happen in the vicinity of Harper's Ferry, and a well informed and candid gentleman told me that he had no doubt Brown believed his plans were found out, or about to be found out, and struck the blow two weeks at least, and perhaps six weeks earlier than he intended. This gentleman is convinced that if the plans had been perfected, Brown would actually have had a negro for every one of his spears, and would have made his way through the mountains of Maryland into Pennsvlvania."

So Robert E. Lee's statement, in his "Report", that local black people gave Brown no voluntary assistance at all, is not correct, though it appeared again in the Senate Special Committee report and in many Southern reports on the raid. Andrew Hunter, Virginia Governor Henry A. Wise's attorney and the prosecutor in Charles Town, informed Wise confidentially that: "We believed and knew, as we thought then and still think, that he [Brown] could not seduce our slaves. It may be here remarked that, so far as I knew or learned from any quarter, not a single one of the slaves in the county of Jefferson or in Maryland, adjacent, ever did join him in his raid, except by coercion, and then they escaped as soon as they could and went back to their homes." Judge Parker concurred. Wise turned this statement into a claim he made repeatedly in speeches: "not a slave around was found faithless". These "faithful slaves" who allegedly refused to help Brown at Harpers Ferry became a key element in the "Lost Cause" myth of happy Antebellum Southern life. The United Daughters of the Confederacy had later a "Faithful Slave Committee" trying to honor them with a monument in Harpers Ferry (see Hayward Shepherd Monument).

However, we know positively, said a newspaper story, that some 25 enslaved black people, out of 200 acquainted to some degree with Brown's project, helped the raiders; they all claimed to have been impressed (forced). Another source says that "there has  not been more than 20 negroes under arms." The True Bill of Indictment gives the names of 11 slaves whom the conspirators had allegedly incited to revolt, 4 of Lewis Washington (Jim, Sam, Mason, and Catesby), and 7 of John Allstadt (Henry, Levi, Ben, Herry, Phil, George, and Bill), plus "other slaves to the jurors unknown". Of those, we have clear documentation of two that were with Brown voluntarily. One was Jim, "a young coachman hired by Lewis Washington from an owner in Winchester"; he drowned attempting to flee by crossing the river. "There is no doubt that Washington's negro coachman, Jim, who was chased into the river and drowned, had joined the rebels with a good will. A pistol was found on him, and he had his pockets filled with ball cartridges, when he was fished out of the river."

Ben, who was owned by John Allstadt, was captured and almost lynched. He died in the Charles Town jail of "pneumonia and fright", along with his mother Ary, also owned by Allstadt, who had come to nurse him. Both owners filed claims with the government of Virginia for compensation for the loss of their "property" in the raid; it is not known if their claims were successful.

These are not the only black people that fled their owners and participated in the raid. According to Frederick Douglass, "fifty slaves were collected and emancipation was proclaimed in Virginia and Maryland".

The first report on "insurrectionists" killed gave the number of 17, but only 10 were Brown's men, and the other 7 must have been liberated slaves helping him. One was "an old slaveman of the neighborhood, who distinguished himself by reckless courage." He shot armorer Boerly after the latter shot Newby. "He was probably killed soon after." "In the engine house there were "a few negroes that had been liberated and armed by Brown". Except for Ben and Jim, their names are unknown. "The number of colored men slain by the reckless fire of the belligerants is given as seventeen." There were twelve or thirteen bodies immediately buried, but only the names of eight are known. There were other slaves killed whose bodies were carried away by the river. According to Louis DeCaro, at the peak there were 20 to 30 local slaves involved, who quickly and quietly went back to their masters' when it became clear the raid was failing.

According to the 1860 census, there were 589 escaped slaves in Jefferson  County. "No adjacent Counties reported any [or] very, very few such escapes in the same census." There is a long list of fires set in Jefferson County during the final months of 1859, including those at the farms of men who had been on the jury that convicted Brown.

In Harpers Ferry, a Black Voices Museum, at 17 High Street, was operating in 2020.

Burials

None of those killed (10) or executed (7) are buried in Harpers Ferry, Charles Town, or anywhere else in Jefferson County. Virginia Governor Henry A. Wise said he did not want those executed to be buried anywhere in Virginia, and none were.

Three bodies—1 white (Jerry Anderson) and 2 black (Copeland, Green)—were used for the dissection component of medical studies. The remains after the dissection were apparently discarded. In 1928, a pit containing bones of those dissected was found underneath the foundation of a building being torn down. The medical students and faculty did not know, or care, who they were. Their fourth body, that of Watson Brown, was identified from papers in a pocket as one of Brown's sons, though they did not know which one. It was preserved by a medical school professor and made into an anatomical exhibit, labeled expressing the Virginians' attitude toward abolitionists, and  toward John Brown in particular.

Except for those mentioned below as buried by relatives, and the 3 missing bodies that were dissected, the other raiders killed or executed in 1859–1860 are buried at the John Brown Farm State Historic Site, near Lake Placid, New York.

Note that while there were 10 men killed during the raid itself, and 10 bodies reburied together at the John Brown Farm, the 10 are not the same. 2 of the first 10 (Watson Brown, Jeremiah Anderson) were taken to the Winchester Medical College for use by medical students. To the 8 remaining were added the bodies of Hazlett and Stevens, part of the raid but tried and originally buried separately. A relative of Stevens had his and Hazlett's bodies disinterred from their graves in New Jersey, so they could be buried with the others.

Symbols
‡ The bodies of the 4 so marked were taken to Winchester Medical College for dissection by medical students.

One was killed during the raid (Jerry Anderson): another died shortly after (Watson Brown), and two were tried and executed (Green and Copeland); the last two were African Americans. Except for Watson, the location of their remains is unknown. Medical schools in the South routinely used bodies of the enslaved for this purpose, citing the availability of such bodies as an incentive to enroll.

† marks the 10 buried in 1899 in a single coffin on the John Brown Farm in North Elba, New York, according to a plaque there.

 They include the remaining 8 of the 10 killed during the raid itself. Unwelcome in local cemeteries, they were thrown into two "store boxes", and two Black men, for $5.00 each, buried them, without ceremony, clergy, or marker, on the far side of the Shenandoah (in Clarke County). The family knew that Oliver was buried "by the Shenandoah", but no more. Forty years later, one of the men who buried them was still alive, the unmarked pit was located, and the remains, which could not be matched to specific individuals, were exhumed and taken to North Elba—in secret because locals would have prevented it if they had known—and reburied in a single coffin, which was donated by the town of North Elba. Rev. Joshua Young, who had presided over Brown's funeral 40 years earlier, performed the last rites. Richard J. Hinton spoke at length. The plaque says the remains of Jeremiah Anderson are there as well, but this is not correct; they are lost, as are those of the two African Americans dissected.

With those 8, in the same coffin and ceremony, were the remains of Hazlitt and Stevens, who had been executed, and whose bodies had been buried at the Eagleswood Military Academy in Perth Amboy, New Jersey. A relative of Stevens had them disinterred so they could be buried with the others.

¶ indicates an African American.

Killed during the raid
 Bodies taken to Charles Town for dissection by medical students at the Winchester Medical College:
 ‡ Watson Brown, 24, John Brown's son, was mortally wounded outside the engine house while carrying a white flag to negotiate with the opposing militia. He was not shot by a Marine, as they respected the white flag, but by an infuriated townsman. He survived in agony for another day. His body was taken by Winchester Medical College, skinned, and preserved as an anatomical specimen. When a Union army occupied Winchester in 1862, his body was "rescued" by a Union doctor, who had it shipped to his home in Indiana. It was returned to the family and buried in North Elba in 1882. See Burning of Winchester Medical College.
 ‡ Jeremiah Goldsmith "Jerry" Anderson, 26, from Indiana. He had been with Brown in Kansas. Brown was "attended, generally, in his movements about the city [Boston] and its neighborhood, by a faithful henchman, Jerry Anderson." He was killed by a Marine's bayonet during the final assault on the engine house. He had in his pocket a letter from his brother John J. (or G. or Q.) Anderson, of  Chillicothe, Ohio. His body was taken by Winchester Medical College; last resting place unknown.

 First buried in two unmarked boxes near Harpers Ferry; re-interred in 1899 in a common coffin in North Elba:
 † John Henry Kagi, 24, from Ohio, was with Brown in Kansas. He was shot and killed while attempting to cross the Shenandoah River. One report says mistakenly that his body was taken for dissection.
 † William Thompson, from North Elba, N.Y. He was brother of Adolphus. He and his brother were brothers of Henry Thompson, who was married to Ruth, John Brown's eldest daughter.
 † Adolphus Dauphin Thompson, from North Elba, N.Y., was killed in the storming of the engine house. He was brother of William.
 † Oliver Brown, 21, the youngest of John Brown's three sons to participate in the action. He was described by his mother as the child "most like his father, caring most for learning of all our children." He was mortally wounded on the 17th inside the engine house, and died beside his father.
 † Steward Taylor, 22, from Uxbridge, Ontario, Canada, who attended the Chatham convention. According to Brown's daughter Annie, "He was more what might be called a crank than any of the party. ...He became strongly imbued with the idea that he would be one of the first killed in the coming encounter, but this fixed belief did not cause the slightest shrinking on his part."
 † William Leeman, from Maine, youngest of all the raiders, was shot and killed while trying to escape across the Potomac River. His sister, Mrs. S. H. Brown, published a letter of John Brown of November 28, 1859, which according to her had never been published. From it we learn he was killed not trying to escape, but on a message to deliver a message of John Brown to Owen Brown or Cook.
 †¶Lewis Sheridan Leary, a 24-year-old free black, uncle of Copeland, was from Oberlin, Ohio. "He said before he died that he enlisted with Capt. Brown for the insurrection at a fair held in Lorraine County, Ohio, and received the money to pay his expenses."  He was mortally wounded while trying to escape across the Shenandoah River. He was stationed in the rifle factory with Kagi. John Copeland was his nephew; Langston Hughes was his grandson. There is a cenotaph memorial in Oberlin, Ohio.
 †¶ Dangerfield Newby, about 35, from Ohio, described as a "huge mulatto", was born into slavery, with a white father who was not his owner. He was given permission to move to Ohio along with his mother and siblings, but when he tried to gain freedom for his wife and children, their owner refused to sell them even after Newby had earned and saved the agreed-upon price. This inspired Newby to join Brown's raid. He was the first raider killed. His body was mutilated: his ears and genitals were cut off as souvenirs.
 Disposition of body unknown
 ¶Jim, who Brown's men had freed from Lewis Washington, who leased Jim from his owner. According to Osborne Anderson, Jim fought "like a tiger". He was killed while trying to escape, which must have meant attempting to swim the river, and his body was presumably carried away downstream.

Captured, tried, convicted, and executed by hanging

In the Charles Town jail, by one report, Brown and Hazlett shared a room and a bed, Green and Coppock another, manacled together, and Copeland was in a third room. The rooms in the jail were described as "very large and nicely kept".

Brown was executed on Friday, December 2, four others on December 16, 1859, the negroes (Copeland, Green) in the morning and the whites (Cook, Coppock) in the afternoon, and two (Hazlitt, Stevens) on March 16, 1860. Cook and Coppock attempted to escape, but did not get over the jail wall.

To prevent a rescue, spectators at Brown's execution were very limited. (See .) In contrast, Governor Wise wanted there to be a "tremendous" crowd for the December 16 hangings, and the Sheriff so informed the newspapers. "The execution was witnessed by an immense throng." There was a dress parade; among the participants was Lt. Israel Green of the U.S. Marines, the one who led the assault on the engine house.

 Buried by relatives
John Brown, 59. His widow took his body to North Elba, and buried him there. On the transportation of his corpse, which was not uneventful, see John Brown's body.
 Edwin Coppock 24, shot and killed the mayor of Harpers Ferry, Fontaine Beckham, during the raid. He had been with John Brown in Kansas. He was visited in jail by "three Quaker gentlemen from Ohio, with whom he had lived in his boyhood, and an uncle, from the same State." One newspaper report says that his body was sent to his mother in Springdale, Iowa, another that it was sent to a Thomas Winn in Springdale, accompanied by his uncle, "a highly esteemed old Quaker gentleman, who did not sympathize in the least with the misguided and errant young man, and by him [the body was] conveyed to the home of his afflicted mother." A different report says that the Quaker was not a relative, but someone who took him in when he became an orphan.
 John Edwin Cook, sometimes spelled Cooke, 29,  born in Haddam, Connecticut, but was from Pennsylvania. He had been a teacher. He was Brown's second in command, by one report, had been with Brown in Kansas, and had lived undercover for over a year in Harpers Ferry. He was described as "a man of some intelligence", "a quick-witted, intelligent man", from a good family, who had studied law and taught school. He escaped into Pennsylvania after the raid, but Governor Wise offered a reward of $1,000, and he was soon captured. His attorney at the time, Alexander McClure, published lengthy recollections. A band played as he was taken from the jail in Chambersburg to the train that would take him to Charles Town for trial.

On October 28 he was visited in jail by his brother-in-law, Governor Ashbel P. Willard of Indiana, who wanted to be sure that this was his wife's brother, as the family had lost contact with him and had assumed he was dead. Accompanying him, at his request, were Indiana Attorney General Joseph E. McDonald and the U.S. District Attorney for Indiana, Daniel W. Voorhees. He was escorted to Cook's cell by Senator Mason, who offered to withdraw to give them privacy, but Willard replied that this was not necessary. He advised Cook that he should confess, "so as to exonerate those who were innocent, and to punish those who were implicated, as the only atonement he could now make." He told Cook that he had nothing to hope for but death. A different report, 40 years later, says that Voorhees had arranged with Governor Wise for Cook to escape, but that Cook refused. On November 8 Voorhees addressed the court, calling for mercy for "misled" Cook; his address was published widely. Cook was the only one captured who gave testimony about the other raiders;  his testimony at his trial was immediately published as a pamphlet, so as to raise money for one of the victims. This motivated the Richmond Enquirer to call him "the most guilty of the Charlestown prisoners. So far from being the dupe of Old Brown, Osawatomie is the victim of John E. Cook."

On December 14 he was visited for some hours by Governor Willard, Voorhees, Willard's wife, and another sister. Body sent to A. P. Willard, care of Cook's brother-in-law Robert Crowley, Williamsburg, New York. First buried in Cypress Hill Cemetery, Brooklyn, New York, he was later reburied in Green-Wood Cemetery, also in Brooklyn.

Bodies immediately dug up by students of the Winchester Medical College. "They were allowed to remain in the ground but a few moments, when they were taken up and conveyed to Winchester for dissection." (See Burning of Winchester Medical College.) A letter from Black residents of Philadelphia to Governor Wise, requesting their bodies so as to bury them, had no effect. In the early 20th century a pit containing loose bones of those dissected at the College was discovered.
 ‡¶ John Anthony Copeland, Jr., a 24-year-old free Black, described as a mulatto, joined the raiders along with his uncle Lewis Leary. Of Brown's raiders, only Copeland was at all well known. As a leader of the Oberlin-Wellington fugitive slave rescue, he was notorious in Ohio, and was a fugitive from an indictment for his role in that rescue. His parents attempted unsuccessfully to recover his body. On December 29, 3,000 attended a bodyless funeral in Oberlin, Ohio. The last resting place is unknown. Cenotaph memorial in Oberlin.
 ‡¶ Shields Green, 22, was an escaped Black slave from South Carolina. He was captured in the engine house on October 18, 1859, and hanged December 16, 1859, in Charles Town. The body was claimed by Winchester Medical College as a teaching cadaver. The last resting place is unknown. Cenotaph memorial in Oberlin, Ohio.
 Two raiders were not captured until it was too late to hold their trials during the term of the Jefferson County Circuit Court that ended on November 11, after pronouncing sentence on Coppock, Cook, Copeland, and Green on the 10th. The Legislature of Virginia authorized a special term of the Jefferson County Court to deal with them and other pending business. The Court reconvened on February 1; in the meantime Hazlett and Stevens were held in the Jefferson County Jail. Found guilty of the same charges, they were executed on March 16, 1860.
 † Albert E. Hazlett escaped into Pennsylvania but was soon captured. Executed March 16, 1860.
 † Aaron Dwight Stevens (Lee has Aaron C. Stevens), from Connecticut, 29, was the only one of Brown's men who had formal military training. He was shot and captured October 18. Executed March 16, 1860.
Their bodies were sent immediately to Perth Amboy, New Jersey, to the house of Marcus and Rebecca B. Spring, the latter of whom had nursed them in the Charles Town jail. A funeral was held there. The bodies were buried at the Eagleswood Cemetery, at the nearby Eagleswood Military Academy, an abolitionist school directed at one time by Theodore Weld, next to the graves of James G. Birney and her father Arnold Buffum.  In 1898 they were reinterred with eight others at the John Brown Farm in North Elba, New York.

Captured, died in jail
 ¶Ben (Allstadt), freed by Brown's men from his owner, John Allstadt. His mother Ary, also belonging to Allstadt, came to the jail to nurse him and also died there.

Escaped north and never captured
Francis Jackson Merriam and Barclay Coppock joined Owen Brown in his prolonged, hazardous escape across Pennsylvania, finally taking refuge in Ashtabula County, Ohio, where John Brown Jr. lived. They were described as voters there.

In November of 1859, Governor Wise offered a reward of $500 each for the apprehension of the four white escapees.

A Charles Town grand jury in February of 1860 indicted them, along with Jeremiah Anderson , for "conspiring with slaves to create insurrection". When new Virginia Governor John Letcher asked Governor William Dennison Jr. of Ohio to extradite them, he declined to issue warrants for their arrest, saying he had not received sufficient justification for doing so.

 ¶ Osborne Perry Anderson is both the only Black escapee and the only escapee that had been in the engine house. He is also the only raider to publish a memoir about the raid. He served as a recruiter for the Union Army, and died in poverty in 1872.

 Charles Plummer Tidd, a "lumberman" from Maine, had been a farmer in Kansas, where he met Brown. He died during the Civil War, 1862. Another reference says he was from Worcester County, Massachusetts. After enlisting in the Union Army, while his regiment was stationed at Roanoke Island, North Carolina, he died of a fever; his remains are buried at New Bern, North Carolina. Owen Brown, upset at the reaction to his comments on Tidd in his interview published in The Atlantic, said in a reply letter: "[M]y impressions of Tidd are that he was a very warm friend, generally of peaceful disposition, true, and devoted to his ideas of rights and moral principle. He was firm and persistent in what he undertook, somewhat inclined to be arbitrary, and with a temper not always under perfect control. As a whole, he stands far above the average of men. I hold for him a warm friendship."

The following three remained at the Kennedy Farm in Maryland, guarding the weapons. 

 Owen Brown, after a very difficult trip, made it to the safety of his brother Jason's house in Ohio. For many years he raised grapes on an island in Lake Erie, "for the Chicago market" (not for wine). He died January 8, 1889 in Pasadena, California. His funeral was an event (with marching band) and his burial site, atop a peak named (because of him) "Brown's Peak", is a local tourist attraction.
 Barclay Coppock, 22 or 23, from Iowa like his brother, safely reached Canada. He died in the Union Army in 1861.
 Francis Jackson Meriam, 28 or 30, "of the wealthy Massachusetts Meriams", who "had furnished a good deal of money to the cause". Two days before the attack on Harpers Ferry, before a lawyer in Chambersburg, accompanied by Kagi, he made his will, leaving most of his estate to the Massachusetts Anti-Slavery Society. After the raid, "he reached the railroad in Maryland, passed on to Philadelphia, where he remained overnight at the Merchants' Hotel, registering his true name, and proceeded next morning to Boston." Another source says that he went to Canada before coming to "his physician in Boston. He served in the Union army as a captain in the 3rd South Carolina Volunteer Infantry Regiment (Colored). (Colored regiments had white officers.) He died of natural causes in 1865. A conflicting report says that he "went to Mexico to join [Benito] Juárez in 1865...and has not since been heard from".

(The plaque at the John Brown Farm says a negro named John Anderson escaped; the source for this is apparently biographer Franklin Sanborn, who has nothing else to say about him and omits him from the book index. There was no person of that name among Brown's raiders; Brown received in jail a letter from John Q. Anderson, brother of Jeremiah, inquiring about his brother. Later Sanborn calls John Anderson "rather mythical", someone "whom Hayden enlisted for Brown, but who never got to the Ferry".)

Gallery (alphabetical)

References

Winchester Medical College
Participants in John Brown's raid on Harpers Ferry
Robert E. Lee